Sadakhlo (Georgian: სადახლო) is a village in Georgia located in the southern part of country in the administrative territory of Marneuli Municipality (Kvemo Kartli Region) at the border with Armenia. Sadakhlo is the largest village in Georgia, and is the center of the eponymous administrative community (თემი, temi) that includes 4 other nearby villages: Burma, Tazakendi, Molaoghli, and Khuldara.

The Sadakhlo market played a remarkable role in the interaction between Azerbaijanis and Armenians, in light of the Nagorno-Karabakh conflict. Sadakhlo is almost entirely populated with Azerbaijanis, and is an important border town with Armenia. Since Georgia took a neutral stance in this conflict, it became a neutral territory in which both peoples could freely and safely interact with each other.

Six kilometers west of Sadakhlo, in the village of Tsopi along the national route Sh37 to Akhkerpi, the ruins of the medieval Tsopi fortress can be found. This castle dates from the 5th-6th century.

Population
The population of Sadakhlo village is 7,337 according to the 2014 census. Apart from a few dozen people, the village is mono-ethnic Azerbaijani (99.8%).

Transport

The road of international importance S7 (E001), the main road between Tbilisi and Yerevan (Armenia), passes through Sadakhlo. The Sadakhlo - Bagratashen border crossing is the most important of the four vehicular crossings between Georgia and Armenia. More than 1.2 million incoming travellers were registered in 2019. This is 15.7% of all inbound travellers to Georgia. This also leads to additional investments in infrastructure. With European money the car bridge across the Debeda is being renovated and expanded to four lanes.

There is a train station in Sadakhlo, which is on the Tbilisi - Gyumri - Yerevan railway line which opened in 1899. The railway runs along the village and crosses the border parallel to the S7. There are frequent night trains between Tbilisi and Yerevan. The station serves not only as a terminus for the Tbilisi - Sadakhlo commuter trains and stop for the international trains, but also as a border post for the latter. Nearly 3,400 passengers entered Georgia here in 2019.

From the center of Sadakhlo, the national route Sh37 heads west to Akhkerpi, which also has a border crossing to Armenia. It is Georgia's least used border crossing with 133 arriving travelers in 2019.

See also
 Kvemo Kartli
 Marneuli Municipality

References 

Populated places in Marneuli Municipality
Tiflis Governorate